Babatunde Olusegun Adewale(born June 14, 1975), popularly known by his stage name Modenine, is an English-born Nigerian rapper. In 2014, he released a song titled "Super Human" with Jamaican-American rapper Canibus.

Early life
Mode9 was born in London on June 14, 1975. He is the third child of his parents who are from Osun State. He has credited Grandmaster Flash and The Furious Five for inspiring his love for Hip Hop.

Education
He attended Agboju secondary school. He earned a degree in Building Technology at Federal Polytechnic Bida, Niger State, Nigeria.

Career
He worked with Rhythm 84.7fm in Abuja, Nigeria as a radio presenter.

In an interview with hot FM's breakfast show with TuTu Adeoba and Cheezy Charles in 2013, the artiste complained about Nigerians not being lovers of his style of song as he claimed to have released an album and nobody cared about it. He however reaffirmed that he won't change his style of music as far as his real fans still appreciate him.

Discography
In 2004, Mode9 released his debut project, Malcolm IX. His next album, Pentium IX was released in 2006. In 2007, he released another album called É Pluribus Unum. Modenine has eight studio albums. He released in 2018, a new album titled Hence4th produced by Black Intelligence. In 2019, he released an album titled The Monument

Single Albums
Malcolm IX -2004 
Pentium IX - 2006
E' Pluribus Unum "One Amongst Many" -2007 
The Paradigm Shift -2008
Da Vinci Mode -2010
Above Ground Level - 2014
Insulin - 2016
The Monument (By Stormatique) - 2019

Featured Albums
Modenine & Alias  - Pay At-10-Shun - 2010
Modenine & Mills The Producer - Golden Era Guevara New Era Mandela - 2011
Modenine & XYZ  - Alphabetical Order - 2013
Modenine and DJ Papercutt - Look What I Found EP - 2016
Modenine & Black Intelligence - Hence4th - 2018

Mixtapes
Malcolm IX - The Lost Sessions - 2004
Pentium IX - The Mixtape - 2005
Nigel Benn's KraftWork (Modenine and Kraft) - The Soul Edition -  2007
09.09.09 The Mix Tape - 2009
Occupy The Throne - 2012

References

Nigerian male rappers
1975 births
English people of Nigerian descent
Musicians from Osun State
The Headies winners
Living people
Yoruba musicians
English people of Yoruba descent
Rappers from London
Hardcore hip hop artists